I Heard a Voice – Live from Long Beach Arena is the first live DVD release from the rock band AFI. It was released on December 12, 2006. The concert was filmed at the Long Beach Arena in Long Beach, California on Friday, September 15, 2006. Part of the Decemberunderground Tour, the crowd was the largest AFI had ever headlined with over 13,000 people in attendance. The concert was shot in HD with more than 23 cameras. The title of this DVD is lifted from a line of poetry in the decemberunderground CD booklet. Underneath the song "37mm", it says: "The power went out. I turned on the radio. The power went out. I turned on the radio. The power went out. I turned on the radio...I heard a voice." The moth (which appears to be some species of hummingbird moth) on the case is also from the decemberunderground booklet. 

Throughout the week before the release, the concert film was shown as a screening in various cities. Attendants received a limited edition two-sided poster.

A CD version was released on November 13, 2007.

Track listing
 "Prelude 12/21" - 2:04
 "Girl's Not Grey" - 3:12
 "The Leaving Song Pt. II" - 4:20
 "Summer Shudder" - 3:16
 "Kill Caustic" - 2:50
 "The Days of the Phoenix" - 4:04
 "Endlessly, She Said" - 4:34
 "A Single Second" - 2:45
 "The Missing Frame" - 4:40
 "Bleed Black" - 4:28
 "Silver and Cold" - 5:12
 "Dancing Through Sunday" - 2:34
 "This Time Imperfect" - 4:33
 "Death of Seasons" - 5:14
 "Totalimmortal" - 4:31
 "Love Like Winter" - 3:10
 "God Called in Sick Today" - 4:50
 "Miss Murder" - 3:38

Featured performers
The song "A Single Second" features a guest performance by Nick 13 of the band Tiger Army.

DVD features
Contains 5.1 audio mix.
Includes interviews with The Despair Faction members and a photo gallery.
By clicking the moth logo within the 'Extras' menu, you can access the four videos that featured during AFI's 'Five Flowers' mystery hunt. Each video contains a different member of AFI. This is an Easter egg.

Chart positions

DVD

CD

References

External links
Official DVD Website & Countdown
Official AFI Website

AFI (band) albums
Live video albums
2007 live albums
2007 video albums